Surya Dharma Paloh (born 16 July 1951) is an Indonesian businessman and politician. He owns Media Group, a conglomerate company that include the Media Indonesia daily newspaper and MetroTV, a 24-hour news television channel. In politics, he was the chairman of the advisory board of the Golkar Party, the third biggest political party in Indonesia. He is also the founder of National Democrat mass organization, which later gave birth to the Nasdem Party (Partai Nasional Demokrat) on 26 July 2011.

References

External links
  Surya Paloh

1951 births
Living people
People from Banda Aceh
Nasdem Party politicians
Golkar politicians
University of North Sumatra alumni